UFC on ESPN: Chiesa vs. Magny (also known as UFC on ESPN 20 and UFC Fight Island 8) was a mixed martial arts event produced by the Ultimate Fighting Championship that took place on January 20, 2021, at the Etihad Arena on Yas Island, Abu Dhabi, United Arab Emirates.

Background
Starting with UFC on ABC: Holloway vs. Kattar, a limited number of fans were allowed inside the newly built Etihad Arena, marking the first time since UFC 248 in March 2020 that non-essential event personnel were in attendance. The venue has maximum capacity of over 18,000, but the UFC is expecting to have closer to 2,000 fans for each of the Fight Island's events during the week.

A welterweight bout between Leon Edwards and Khamzat Chimaev was originally expected to headline this event. They were initially scheduled to serve as the headliner for UFC Fight Night: Thompson vs. Neal in December, but the contest was scrapped due to Edwards suffering from severe symptoms of COVID-19. In turn, Chimaev pulled out of the contest on December 29 due to his own COVID-19 recovery. Edwards had hoped to remain on the card against a replacement, but promotion officials intended to leave the pairing intact and reschedule it again for a later date in 2021. As a result, a welterweight bout between The Ultimate Fighter: Live lightweight winner Michael Chiesa and Neil Magny served as the main-event.

A women's flyweight bout between former UFC Women's Flyweight Championship challenger Roxanne Modafferi and Viviane Araújo was briefly linked to an event expected to take place on January 30. However, the fight was rescheduled and took place at this event instead.

Matt Schnell and Tyson Nam met in a flyweight bout at this event. The pairing was previously scheduled to take place in September at UFC Fight Night: Waterson vs. Hill, but the fight was canceled on the day of the event's weigh-in as Schnell was deemed medically unfit to compete due to complications related to his weight cut. They were first rebooked for UFC Fight Night: Thompson vs. Neal, before being moved to this event.

In late December 2020, the UFC opted against holding an event on a planned January 30 date and decided to reschedule several bouts to this card:
A welterweight bout between former WEC Welterweight Champion and former interim UFC Welterweight Champion Carlos Condit and Matt Brown. Finally, they were moved to UFC on ABC: Holloway vs. Kattar. They were initially scheduled to meet at UFC on Fox: Johnson vs. Benavidez 2 in December 2013, but Brown pulled out due to an undisclosed injury. They were booked once again in April 2018 for UFC on Fox: Poirier vs. Gaethje, but Brown had to pull out a second time as he injured his anterior cruciate ligament.
A flyweight bout between Jeff Molina and Zarrukh Adashev. They were briefly expected to meet at UFC Fight Night: Felder vs. dos Anjos, but were eventually rescheduled for the scrapped date. Yet again, Molina withdrew from the event at the end of December due to a positive COVID-19 test and was replaced by Su Mudaerji.
A light heavyweight bout between Vinicius Moreira and Isaac Villanueva.
A bantamweight rematch featuring Pedro Munhoz and Jimmie Rivera. They previously met at UFC Fight Night: Belfort vs. Henderson 3 in November 2015, when Rivera won via split decision. The pairing was rescheduled once again in early January as they were moved to UFC 258 due to undisclosed reasons.
A women's flyweight bout between promotional newcomers Victoria Leonardo and Natália Silva. In turn, Silva pulled out due to a fractured ulna and was replaced by fellow newcomer Manon Fiorot.

A welterweight bout between Mike Jackson and Dean Barry was briefly linked to this event. However, the pairing was scrapped due to undisclosed reasons.

Another matchup that was shortly booked was a middleweight fight between Dalcha Lungiambula and Isi Fitikefu. However, Fitikefu was removed due to an elbow injury and replaced by Markus Perez.

A bantamweight bout between promotional newcomers Umar Nurmagomedov and Sergey Morozov was initially scheduled to take place at UFC 254, but Nurmagomedov pulled out due to an illness. The pairing was then rescheduled for UFC 257. However, the bout was yet again rescheduled to take place at this event.

A middleweight bout between Omari Akhmedov and Tom Breese was originally scheduled for UFC on ABC: Holloway vs. Kattar. However, the pairing was rescheduled to take place at this event due to "COVID-19 related issues".

Results

Bonus awards
The following fighters received $50,000 bonuses.
Fight of the Night: Mike Davis vs. Mason Jones 
Performance of the Night: Warlley Alves and Umar Nurmagomedov

See also 

 List of UFC events
 List of current UFC fighters
 2021 in UFC

References 

UFC on ESPN
2021 in mixed martial arts
January 2021 sports events in Asia
2021 in Emirati sport
Mixed martial arts in the United Arab Emirates
Sports competitions in Abu Dhabi